= Full-size wagon =

Full-size wagon may refer to:

- Passenger full-size vans
- Large SUVs
- Older family station wagons
